Capt. John Koonts Jr. Farm is a historic home and farm complex located near Tyro, Davidson County, North Carolina. The house was built about 1870, and consists of a two-story, hexagonal Italianate Revival style central section with three Greek Revival style one-story wings in a "Y"-plan.  Also on the property are a double pen log barn, a log corn crib, a log granary, and a frame well house.

It was added to the National Register of Historic Places in 1984.

References

Farms on the National Register of Historic Places in North Carolina
Greek Revival houses in North Carolina
Italianate architecture in North Carolina
Houses completed in 1870
Houses in Davidson County, North Carolina
National Register of Historic Places in Davidson County, North Carolina